"Bury the Shovel" is a song written by Chris Arms and Chuck Jones, and recorded by American country music singer Clay Walker. It was released in September 1996 as the fourth and final single from his album Hypnotize the Moon.

The song is Walker's eleventh single release, as well as his eleventh top twenty hit on the Billboard country singles charts.

Critical reception
Larry Flick of Billboard described the song "There is almost a swampy mooodiness to the melody, yet the production is brisk and the production taut. A sure bet to perk up programmer's ears".

Chart positions
"Bury the Shovel" is Walker's eleventh top 40 single on the Billboard country singles chart. The song spent 18 weeks on the chart, peaking at number 18 on the chart week of November 16. It also peaked at number 24 on the RPM Country Tracks chart in Canada.

Charts

References

1996 singles
1995 songs
Clay Walker songs
Songs written by Chuck Jones (songwriter)
Song recordings produced by James Stroud
Giant Records (Warner) singles